Danilo Parra (born in Ecuador, May 14) is an Ecuadorian singer with Colombian, Italian and Spanish roots.

Biography 

Parra became a singer in 2002 and obtained an airplay deal in his country the following year. In 2002 he won the award "Revelacion del Año 2002" (Best New Artist) and at the end of 2003 the magazine La Onda recognized him as the "Best Singer of 2003." Later the magazine Hogar dedicated a page to his record production.

His song "Preciosa" was awarded the "Cancion del 2004" by some national TV programs. Parra was recognized as the "Artist of the year" in 2004.

Discography 
 SuperSingles (2003)
 Mis Canciones (2005)
 Mis Canciones/Mis Versiones (2007)
 Danilo Parra 3,618 (2009)
 El Mejor hombre del mundo (2011)
 ''Canto a Mi País (2014) feat Karlos Xavier

References

External links
 

21st-century Ecuadorian male singers
Living people
Year of birth missing (living people)